Barry McFarland  (born April 22, 1948) is a Canadian politician and was a Member of the Legislative Assembly of Alberta representing the constituency of Little Bow as a Progressive Conservative.

Early life

McFarland was born and raised near Carmangay. He is a graduate of the business administration program at the Southern Alberta Institute of Technology (SAIT) in Calgary. After graduating, he worked in retail credit for Gulf Canada Resources Limited. Since 1972, McFarland and his wife Mary have operated a dryland grain farm near Carmangay.

Political career

McFarland was first elected in a 1992 by-election, when incumbent Raymond Speaker resigned to run for a federal seat. He won the by-election in a tight race, winning by only 262 votes over the Liberal candidate.  It was the closest that the Liberals had come to winning the riding in 70 years.  However, McFarland has never faced another election nearly that close.

He was elected to a sixth term in the 2008 provincial election, receiving 58 percent of the vote. He currently sits on the Standing Committee on the Economy and the Standing Committee on Privileges and Elections, Standing Orders and Printing.

During his five previous terms in office, McFarland sat on numerous committees and chaired the Standing Policy Committee on Agriculture and Municipal Affairs; Alberta Agricultural Research Institute; Standing Policy Committee on Agriculture and Rural Development; Premier's Council in Support of Alberta Families; Prisoner Voting Committee; and Industrial Assessment Review Committee. During his fifth term, McFarland was Associate Minister of Infrastructure and Transportation.

Before entering provincial politics, McFarland was involved in municipal government. He was first elected as a councillor for the County of Vulcan in 1977. Between 1977 and 1992, McFarland served his community in a series of positions, including reeve, school trustee, chair of the Board of Education, and trustee and chair for the Little Bow Auxiliary Hospital.

McFarland was also involved with a number of municipal and agricultural committees, including the Municipal Planning Commission and the Carmangay Seed Cleaning Plant Association.

Personal life

McFarland lives outside Carmangay, Alberta, with his wife, Mary. The couple has four adult children.

He was inducted onto the Palliser Regional Schools Wall of Fame in 2007. His involvement with community groups has included the Carmangay Curling Club, Vulcan Atletika Track Club and local chapters of the Lions Club and the Royal Canadian Legion.

Election results

References

1948 births
Progressive Conservative Association of Alberta MLAs
Living people
People from Vulcan County
Members of the Executive Council of Alberta
21st-century Canadian politicians